Raimo Aulis Anttila (born 1935) is a Finnish linguist and professor emeritus of Indo-European Linguistics at the University of California, Los Angeles.

Biography
Raimo Aulis Anttila was born in Finland in 1935. He was Professor of Comparative Linguistics at the University of Helsinki from 1971 to 1976. He was appointed Professor of Indo-European Linguistics at the University of California, Los Angeles (UCLA) in 1976. Anttila is also an authority on Finno-Ugric languages. Along with Marija Gimbutas and Edgar C. Polomé and Roger Pearson, Anttila was a co-founder of the Journal of Indo-European Studies, and was a member of its Editorial Committee in the 1970s.  Anttila was elected a Corresponding Member of the Finnish Academy of Science and Letters in 1995. Anttila retired from UCLA as Professor Emeritus.

Selected works
 Field theory of meaning and semantic change, 1992
 Change and metatheory at the beginning of the 1990s: the primacy of history, 1993
 Pattern explanation and etymology: collateral evidence and Estonian kolle ‘hearth’, and related words, 1995

Sources
 

1935 births
Finnish editors
Finnish writers
Linguists from Finland
Indo-Europeanists
Academic staff of the University of Helsinki
University of California, Los Angeles faculty
Living people